The Robert E. Lee School, at Ninth and Louisiana Streets in Durant, Oklahoma, was built in 1937.  It was listed on the National Register of Historic Places in 1988.

It is part of the Durant Independent School District.

It is a one-story L-shaped building,  in plan, with a buff brick exterior, with brick laid in running bond.  It has a flat roof with parapets and towers capped by Spanish tile roofs.  It was built as a Works Progress Administration project.

According to its National Register nomination, "The school building is significant because construction of it enabled destitute laborers in the Durant area to find useful employment after months, if not years, of unemployment. Also the structure created an educational environment more conducive to learning. As a WPA school building, the structure is notable for its stylistic allusion to Spanish colonial architecture and its use of brick building materials. It also suggests the relative "prosperity" of urban school districts as opposed to those in rural areas. Within the community the building is unique architecturally because of its style and workmanship."

Albert S. Ross is credited as architect of the project.

References

National Register of Historic Places in Bryan County, Oklahoma

School buildings completed in 1937
Schools in Oklahoma